The  is a Japanese railway line which connects Ōbu Station in Ōbu, Aichi Prefecture with Taketoyo Station in Taketoyo, Aichi Prefecture. It is owned and run by Central Japan Railway Company (JR Central).

The line has been electrified as of 1 March 2015.

Stations

Rolling stock
, 313 series electric multiple unit (EMU) trains are used in two- and four-car formations as well as 311 series EMUs in four-car formations.

Prior to electrification of the line in March 2015, two-car KiHa 75 diesel multiple unit (DMU) and two-car KiHa 25 DMU trains were used on this line in two- or four-car formations.

History
The entire line opened in 1886, becoming a branch when the Obu to Hamamatsu section of the Tokaido Main Line opened two years later. A 1 km freight-only line extended to Taketoyo Minato between 1930 and 1965.

Work started in March 2010 to electrify the line.

On 1 March 2015, the line was electrified, and through services to and from Nagoya commenced.

References

 
Rail transport in Aichi Prefecture
Lines of Central Japan Railway Company
1067 mm gauge railways in Japan